David Clifford Cretney (born 15 January 1954) is a former Manx politician. He was, until March 2014, Minister of Infrastructure in the Isle of Man Government, and had formerly headed the Departments of Community, Culture & Leisure, Trade & Industry, and Tourism & Leisure. He was a Member of the House of Keys for the Manx Labour Party, representing Douglas South from 1985. He has been a member of the upper house, the Legislative Council since 2015.

Before going into politics, Cretney was a shop manager (1977–85) and he was also a businessman in the period 1985–2012.

In December 2012 and early January 2013 he closed down his two bargain-basement retail outlets having chosen not to renew the leases on either of his premises.

Governmental positions
Chairman of the Post Office Authority, 1992–96
Minister of Tourism and Leisure, 1996–2006
Minister of Trade and Industry, 2006–10
Minister of Community, Culture and Leisure, 2010–11
Minister of Infrastructure, 2011–14

References

1954 births
Living people
Manx businesspeople
Members of the House of Keys 1981–1986
Members of the House of Keys 1986–1991
Members of the House of Keys 1991–1996
Members of the House of Keys 1996–2001
Members of the House of Keys 2001–2006
Members of the House of Keys 2006–2011
Members of the House of Keys 2011–2016
Manx Labour Party politicians